Joseph or Joe Herbert may refer to:

 Joseph Herbert (neuroscientist) (born 1936), English scientist
 Joseph W. Herbert (1863–1923), English-American actor, writer and director
 Joseph Glenn Herbert (born 1971), American comedian better known as Jo Koy
 Joe Herbert (footballer) (1895–1959), English footballer for Rochdale.